West Credit Secondary School is a high school in Mississauga, Ontario, Canada. It is a workplace or college destination for the Peel District School Board. Its cousin school, Judith Nyman Secondary School is a high school in Brampton, Ontario, Canada that offers similar trades courses. West Credit and Judith Nyman are currently the only two vocational schools in the Peel District School Board and offer students more choices in trades courses than most other Peel high schools. West Credit S.S. is aimed at students who want to pursue a career in the trades, or sometimes it is recommended for those with an Individual Education Plan (IEP) at the vocational 1 and 2 level. Both high schools offer vocational and applied level courses. Students can participate in programs leading to apprenticeship and can work towards their required apprenticeship courses and training upon completing their Ontario Secondary School Diplomas. 

West Credit also offers an Applied Skilled Trades program and a Doggy Daycare co-op program.

See also
List of high schools in Ontario

References

Peel District School Board
High schools in Mississauga
Educational institutions established in 1986
1986 establishments in Ontario